The 16th Infantry Division (16-ya Pekhotnaya Diviziya) was an infantry formation of the Russian Imperial Army.

Organization
1st Brigade
61st Infantry Regiment
62nd Infantry Regiment
2nd Brigade
63rd Infantry Regiment
64th Infantry Regiment
16th Artillery Brigade

Commanders (Division Chiefs) 
1905-1909 - Lieutenant general Ivan Bogaevsky

Commanders of the 1st Brigade
1905 - Major general Alexander Resin
1909 - Major general Georgy Eihe

Commanders of the 2nd Brigade
1873-1874 - Alexander Bozheryanov
02/03/1874 - 02/26/1874 - Major General Kutnevich, Boris Gerasimovich
02/26/1874 - after 11/01/1877 - Major General Grenquist, Fyodor Ivanovich
on 09.16.1877 - Colonel Tomilovsky, Pyotr Petrovich (temporarily, due to the temporary command of the entire division by F.I. Grenquist)
01.01.1878 - Colonel Panyutin, Vsevolod Fedorovich (temporarily)
1878: Dmitrij Petrovich Dohturov
хх.хх.1878 - 09/28/1884 - Major General Wenzel, Eduard Adolfovich
10/07/1884 - 11/26/1884 - Major General Dmitry Dmitrievich Kozhukhov
11/25/1884 - 04/17/1889 - Major General Osten-Drizen, Nikolai Fedorovich
04.24.1889 - 11.18.1894 - Major General Sirotsynsky, Vladimir Mironovich
08.12.1894 - 30.08.1902 - Major General Zetterman, Otton Lorenzovich
09.16.1902 - 02.05.1904 - Major General Bykov, Alexander Nikolaevich
February 19, 1904 - October 22, 1904 - Major General Pyotr Baluyev
11/27/1904 - 03/06/1911 - Major General Esimontovsky, Vasily Fedorovich
03/06/1911 - 10/11/1913 - Major General Yakubovsky, Joseph Stepanovich
10/29/1913 - 12/31/1913 - Major General Kozlov, Ivan Ivanovich
01/14/1914 - 10/17/1915 - Major General Bauder, Viktor Fedorovich
10/17/1915 - 04/16/1917 - Major General Belyavsky, Alexey Petrovich
04/20/1917 - 05/26/1917 - Commander Colonel Sulimov, Ilya Ilyich
05/26/1917 - 10/07/1917 - Major General Klimenko, Viktor Ivanovich

Artillery Brigade Commanders
1905-1907: Nikolai Ilyich Bulatov

References

Infantry divisions of the Russian Empire
Military units and formations disestablished in 1918